Jeffrey Allan Hoggan (born February 1, 1978) is a Canadian former professional ice hockey forward who played in the National Hockey League (NHL).

Playing career
Although born in Hope, Hoggan spent much of his minor hockey career in the Chilliwack Minor Hockey Association before joining the Powell River Kings of the BCHL. Undrafted, Hoggan attended the University of Nebraska-Omaha and played through three years of eligibility with the Mavericks in the Central Collegiate Hockey Association.

He signed a contract in 2005 with the St. Louis Blues. In July 2006, he signed with the Boston Bruins as a free agent.

On July 29, 2010, Hoggan left North America as a free agent and signed with German team Grizzlys Wolfsburg of the DEL to a one-year contract. After helping Wolfsburg to the finals with 11 goals and 21 points in 38 games in the 2010–11 season, Hoggan signed with fellow German team, the Hannover Scorpions, to a one-year contract with an optional second year on June 14, 2011.

On October 9, 2012, Hoggan signed a one-year AHL contract with the Grand Rapids Griffins for the 2012–13 AHL season. Hoggan won the Calder Cup with the Griffins in 2013. On July 9, 2013, Hoggan re-signed a two-year AHL contract with the Grand Rapids Griffins through the 2014–15 AHL season.

On July 6, 2015, Hoggan signed a one-year contract with the Grand Rapids Griffins. Hoggan was named playing captain for the 2016 Toyota AHL All-Star Classic. Hoggan, who made his first AHL all-star appearance, became the third Griffin to be chosen as a playing captain for an AHL All-Star Classic, joining Kip Miller (2007) and Travis Richards (2004)

At the conclusion of the 2015–16 season, Hoggan was not offered a contract by the Griffins and became an unrestricted free agent.  After joining the Iowa Wild on a professional try-out contract, the Wild signed Hoggan to a standard player contract for the remainder of the 2016–17 season. In 61 games with the Wild, Hoggan contributed with 7 goals and 12 points, ending his professional career at the conclusion of the regular season after 16 professional seasons.

Career statistics

Awards and achievements

References

External links

1978 births
Living people
Boston Bruins players
Canadian ice hockey forwards
Grizzlys Wolfsburg players
Grand Rapids Griffins players
Hannover Scorpions players
Houston Aeros (1994–2013) players
Ice hockey people from British Columbia
Iowa Wild players
Omaha Mavericks men's ice hockey players
People from the Fraser Valley Regional District
Phoenix Coyotes players
Powell River Kings players
Providence Bruins players
St. Louis Blues players
San Antonio Rampage players
Undrafted National Hockey League players
Worcester IceCats players
Canadian expatriate ice hockey players in Germany
AHCA Division I men's ice hockey All-Americans